Manuel Alonso may refer to:

 Manuel Alonso Areizaga (1895–1984), Spanish tennis player
 Manuel A. Alonso (1822–1889), Puerto Rican poet
 Manuel Alonso Corral (1934–2011), Spanish antipope 
 Manuel Alonso Martínez (1827–1891), Spanish jurist and politician
 Manuel Alonso (cyclist), said in one source to have won the 1989 Vuelta a Murcia; other sources say it was Marino Alonso